Bonnetan is a commune in the Gironde department in Nouvelle-Aquitaine in southwestern France.

In 2002, the Tour de France went through the town.

Population

See also
Communes of the Gironde department

References

External links

angelfire.com

Communes of Gironde